Potamonautes loveni is a species of crab in the family Potamonautidae. It is found in Kenya and Uganda. Its natural habitat is rivers.

References

Potamoidea
Freshwater crustaceans of Africa
Crustaceans described in 1924
Taxonomy articles created by Polbot